Hermansen Island is an island in Oscar II Land at Spitsbergen, Svalbard. It has a length of about three kilometers, and is located in Forlandsundet at the mouth of St. Jonsfjorden. The island is named after Norwegian naval officer Andreas Encke Hermansen. The island was protected as a bird reserve in 1973.

References

Islands of Svalbard